FINA Youth Water Polo World Championships is an international water polo tournament held every two years for the players under the age of 18. It was launched by FINA in 2012.

Editions

Men

Women

 2020 FINA Men's Youth Water Polo World Championships in Volos, Greece was cancelled.

Medals

References

External links
Fina archives
https://www.the-sports.org/water-polo-2021-men-s-world-junior-championships-epr113991.html
https://www.the-sports.org/water-polo-2021-women-s-world-junior-championships-epr113211.html
https://www.the-sports.org/water-polo-2020-men-s-world-championships-u16-epr105260.html
https://www.the-sports.org/water-polo-2020-women-s-world-championships-u16-epr105266.html
https://www.the-sports.org/water-polo-2018-men-s-world-youth-championships-epr86181.html
https://www.the-sports.org/water-polo-2018-women-s-world-youth-championships-epr86187.html

Youth
Waterpolo